The Sprockel cabinet was the 5th cabinet of the Netherlands Antilles.

Composition
The cabinet was composed as follows:

|Minister of General Affairs, Justice
|Gerald C. Sprockel
|
|27 June 1969
|-
|Minister of Social Affairs, Economic Affairs
|H.S. Weber
|
|27 June 1969
|-
|Minister of Finance and Welfare
|D.E. Calvo
|
|27 June 1969
|-
|Minister of Education, Culture and Public Health
|A.J. Muyale
|
|27 June 1969
|-
|Minister of Traffic and Communications
|F. Wernet
|
|27 June 1969
|}

References

Cabinets of the Netherlands Antilles
1969 establishments in the Netherlands Antilles
Cabinets established in 1969
Cabinets disestablished in 1969
1969 disestablishments in the Netherlands Antilles